Collin Gillespie (born June 25, 1999) is an American professional basketball player for the Denver Nuggets of the National Basketball Association (NBA) on a two-way contract with the Grand Rapids Gold of the NBA G League. He played college basketball for the Villanova Wildcats. Gillespie was named Big East co-Player of the Year in 2021 and won it outright the following year.

Early life and high school career
Gillespie is the son of a police officer. He attended Archbishop Wood Catholic High School, where he was coached by John Mosco. Gillespie had no Division I scholarship offers coming into his senior year, but received offers from Rider, Hofstra and Villanova after strong play in a tournament. He scored 42 points in a regular-season win over Neumann Goretti featuring Kentucky recruit Quade Green. As a senior, he led the team to a PIAA Class 5A state title in 2017. Gillespie averaged 24.1 points per game as a senior and was named Philadelphia Player of the Year by the Philadelphia Daily News as well as Catholic League Most Valuable Player. He signed a letter of intent with Villanova on April 14, 2017, joining Dhamir Cosby-Roundtree and Jermaine Samuels in the class of 2021.

College career

Gillespie enrolled at Villanova in the fall of 2017, and he wanted to redshirt his freshman year at the school, but coach Jay Wright decided against doing it because Gillespie "was playing above his years." Soon breaking into the rotation, Gillespie scored in double figures in his second collegiate game, but he also had to learn to adjust to the quickness of the college game. Gillespie had to miss more than a month in December and January due to a fractured bone in his left hand sustained in a December 10 practice. However, he returned to action in a January 17 road win over Georgetown. He provided quality minutes and had eight points including two three-pointers in a February 1 win over Creighton due to the absence of Phil Booth with a similar hand injury. Gillespie made his first start on February 10, in an 86–75 win over Butler. In the first round of the NCAA Tournament, Gillespie scored nine points and had a steal in a win versus Radford. He had four points and five rebounds in the 79–62 NCAA championship game win over Michigan. He averaged 4.3 points per game in 14.4 minutes per game. Gillespie posted a 2.6-to-1 assist to turnover ratio, which Wright attributed to him thinking about his teammates and trying to make them better.

Gillespie scored a season-high 30 points in a 77–65 win against Georgetown on February 3, 2019. On March 9, he had 22 points in a 79–75 loss to Seton Hall. As a sophomore, Gillespie averaged 10.9 points per game.

Coming into his junior season, Gillespie broke his nose in practice, forcing him to wear a mask for several games. Gillespie had 27 points and six assists in an 87–78 loss to Baylor in the championship game of the Myrtle Beach Classic. He was named to the All-Tournament Team and Big East player of the week on November 25. On January 28, 2020, Gillespie had his first double-double with 17 points and a career-high 13 rebounds in a 79–59 win over St. John's. Gillespie scored a season-high 29 points on February 16, in a 76–56 win over Temple. At the conclusion of the regular season, Gillespie was selected to the Second Team All-Big East. He averaged 15.1 points, 4.5 assists, and 1.2 steals per game on a team that finished 24–7.

Coming into his senior season, Gillespie was named to the Bob Cousy Award watchlist as well as Preseason First Team All-Big East. He tore his MCL during a 72–60 win over Creighton on March 3, 2021, ending his season. At the conclusion of the regular season, Gillespie was named Big East Co-Player of the Year alongside teammate Jeremiah Robinson-Earl and Seton Hall's Sandro Mamukelashvili. He averaged 14 points and 4.6 assists per game. Gillespie decided to take advantage of the additional season of eligibility granted by the NCAA due to the COVID-19 pandemic.

On February 15, 2022, Gillespie scored a career-high 33 points despite playing on a swollen ankle in an 89–84 win at Providence.

Professional career

Denver Nuggets (2022–present) 
After going undrafted in the 2022 NBA draft, Gillespie signed a two-way contract with the Denver Nuggets. Gillespie joined the Nuggets' 2022 NBA Summer League team. In his Summer League debut, Gillespie scored 11 points, six rebounds, and four assists in a 78–85 loss to the Minnesota Timberwolves. In four Summer League games, he averaged 11.3 points, 5.3 rebounds, and 4.3 assists per game.

On July 30, 2022, the Nuggets announced that Gillespie had undergone surgery for a lower leg fracture and that he would be out indefinitely.

National team career
In the summer of 2019, Gillespie was a part of the United States National team who competed at the Pan American Games in Peru. The team won bronze, defeating Dominican Republic behind 25 points from Gillespie.

Career statistics

College

|-
| style="text-align:left;"| 2017–18
| style="text-align:left;"| Villanova
| 32 || 1 || 14.4 || .452 || .394 || .800 || 1.3 || 1.1 || .6 || .1 || 4.3
|-
| style="text-align:left;"| 2018–19
| style="text-align:left;"| Villanova
| 35 || 35 || 29.4 || .409 || .379 || .839 || 2.4 || 2.8 || 1.1 || .1 || 10.9
|-
| style="text-align:left;"| 2019–20
| style="text-align:left;"| Villanova
| 31 || 31 || 34.1 || .406 || .357 || .817 || 3.7 || 4.5 || 1.2 || .1 || 15.1
|-
| style="text-align:left;"| 2020–21
| style="text-align:left;"| Villanova
| 20 || 20 || 33.4 || .428 || .376 || .833 || 3.3 || 4.6 || 1.0 || .0 || 14.0
|-
| style="text-align:left;"| 2021–22
| style="text-align:left;"| Villanova
| 38 || 38 || 34.2 || .434 || .415 || .905 || 3.8 || 3.2 || 1.0 || .0 || 15.6
|- class="sortbottom"
| style="text-align:center;" colspan="2"| Career
| 156 || 125 || 28.9 || .422 || .387 || .848 || 2.9 || 3.1 || 1.0 || .0 || 11.9

References

External links

Villanova Wildcats bio

1999 births
Living people
All-American college men's basketball players
American men's basketball players
Basketball players at the 2019 Pan American Games
Basketball players from Pennsylvania
Medalists at the 2019 Pan American Games
Pan American Games bronze medalists for the United States
Pan American Games medalists in basketball
People from Warminster, Pennsylvania
Point guards
Sportspeople from Bucks County, Pennsylvania
United States men's national basketball team players
Villanova Wildcats men's basketball players